Nawabzada Ikram Ahmed Khan, commonly known as I.A. Khan, was a Pakistani bureaucrat and administrator who was the Chairman of the Pakistan Cricket Board (PCB) between 1969 and 1972. He also served as the President of Karachi Cricket Association (KCA) for two years.

He died in 2001. His son, Asad I.A Khan, is a professional golfer.

References

2001 deaths
Year of birth missing
Place of birth missing
Pakistan Cricket Board Presidents and Chairmen
Pakistani civil servants